During the 2005–06 season, West Ham United competed in the FA Premier League, following promotion from the Football League Championship the previous season.

Season summary
West Ham had barely scraped into the top six of the Championship the previous season before gaining promotion via the play-offs, so few gave the Hammers much hope of Premiership survival. However, West Ham surprised their naysayers to stand fourth at the end of October after 11 points from their opening six games. A run of mediocre form saw West Ham fall to tenth, before a run of five straight wins between January and February, including a 3–2 win at Arsenal, which saw the Hammers become the last side to beat Arsenal at Highbury, saw them rise to sixth. Alan Pardew won the Manager of the Month award for February. Several more good results, including a 2–1 home win over Tottenham Hotspur on the last day of the season that denied the North London side Champions League qualification, saw West Ham finish in ninth, above Everton, Middlesbrough and Manchester City.

West Ham's best form came in the FA Cup, where they overcame Blackburn Rovers, Bolton Wanderers and Middlesbrough to reach the FA Cup final – their first since 1980 – against a Liverpool side that were the reigning European champions and finished third in the Premiership. In spite of the odds, West Ham took a 2–0 lead within the first half-hour and also led 3–2 before a Steven Gerrard equalised at the end of normal time. Extra time proved goalless and a penalty shoot-out was required. Liverpool goalkeeper Pepe Reina, who had made several errors in the match, saved from Bobby Zamora, Paul Konchesky and Anton Ferdinand to give Liverpool a 3–1 win. However, as Liverpool had already qualified for the Champions League, West Ham qualified for the UEFA Cup.

Final league table

First-team squad
Squad at end of season

Left club during season

Results

Premier League

League Cup

FA Cup

Statistics

Overview

Goalscorers

Appearances and goals

|-
! colspan=12 style=background:#dcdcdc; text-align:center| Goalkeepers

|-
! colspan=12 style=background:#dcdcdc; text-align:center| Defenders

|-
! colspan=12 style=background:#dcdcdc; text-align:center| Midfielders

|-
! colspan=12 style=background:#dcdcdc; text-align:center| Forwards

|}

Transfers

In

Out

References

2005-06
2005–06 FA Premier League by team
West Ham United
West Ham United